Ruidoso Downs is a city in Lincoln County, New Mexico, United States, located within the Lincoln National Forest. The population was 1,824 at the 2000 census and 2,815 at the 2010 census. Originally incorporated as a village, it became a city in May 2002. Known locally as "the Downs", Ruidoso Downs is a suburb of adjacent Ruidoso and is a part of the Ruidoso Micropolitan Statistical Area. The city, located along U.S. Route 70, is named after the Ruidoso Downs Race Track, which is located in the city along with the Billy the Kid Casino and the Hubbard Museum of the American West.

History

According to a local Ruidoso Downs historian, early on Hispanos settlers called the area "San Juanito". The settlers began arriving in the early in the late 1840s, and introduced rodeo and horse racing to the area. Originally the area had scattered farms and ranches, with the Dowlin Mill constructed in 1868. A new wave of families arrived after the Lincoln County War.

By around 1907 the road between Roswell and Alamogordo, which passed through the area, was still primitive, though it was improved in the 1920s through the Federal Aid Project. The road that would become US 70 was paved in the area around 1945, and then improved again in 1958. The road became four lanes in 1981.

In 1946 the Ruidoso News was founded and the airport opened, and two years later radio arrived. Electric lights appeared in the area in 1947. The White Mountain Inn opened in the 1940s as a sanatorium and as a lodging establishment.

Geography
Ruidoso Downs is located in southern Lincoln County at  (33.331690, -105.596079). It is bordered to the west by Ruidoso.

U.S. Route 70 passes through the city, leading east  to Roswell and southwest over Apache Summit  to Tularosa. New Mexico State Road 48 departs US 70 just west of the city limits, leading north  to Capitan.

The city is in the valley of the Rio Ruidoso, which rises to the west on Sierra Blanca Peak and flows east to form the Rio Hondo.

Demographics

As of the census of 2000, there were 1,824 people, 680 households, and 490 families residing in the village. The population density was 856.7 people per square mile (330.6/km). There were 921 housing units at an average density of 432.6 per square mile (166.9/km). The racial makeup of the village was 67.32% White, 0.77% African American, 3.56% Native American, 0.71% Asian, 0.27% Pacific Islander, 24.45% from other races, and 2.91% from two or more races. Hispanic or Latino of any race were 43.70% of the population.

There were 680 households, out of which 39.0% had children under the age of 18 living with them, 48.8% were married couples living together, 17.4% had a female householder with no husband present, and 27.8% were non-families. 21.2% of all households were made up of individuals, and 5.1% had someone living alone who was 65 years of age or older. The average household size was 2.68 and the average family size was 3.09.

In the city the population was spread out, with 29.1% under the age of 18, 8.2% from 18 to 24, 28.6% from 25 to 44, 24.8% from 45 to 64, and 9.4% who were 65 years of age or older. The median age was 35 years. For every 100 females, there were 95.9 males. For every 100 females age 18 and over, there were 92.4 males.

The median income for a household in the village was $29,375, and the median income for a family was $30,500. Males had a median income of $22,000 versus $17,623 for females. The per capita income for the village was $12,144. About 17.4% of families and 20.6% of the population were below the poverty line, including 29.7% of those under age 18 and 5.9% of those age 65 or over.

Transportation

Airports

Major highways
 U.S. Route 70

Key facilities

Ruidoso Downs Race Track
Billy the Kid Casino
Hubbard Museum of the American West

Events and culture

The city is the annual location of the All American Futurity, which claims to be the richest race in Quarter Horse racing.

On October 9–11, 2009, the twentieth annual Lincoln Cowboy Symposium was held at Ruidoso Downs. The event celebrated the ranching lifestyle, with demonstrations in horsemanship, shooting, roping, cooking, and blacksmithing. Booths offered western-style arts and crafts. Music and poetry were highlights of the festival, which featured performers Leon Rausch, Tommy Allsup and the Texas Playboys; Mel Tillis and the Statesiders; Larry Gatlin; Billy Mata, and Liz Talley. Gospel artists also performed.

See also
 Lincoln National Forest

References

External links

 

Cities in Lincoln County, New Mexico
Cities in New Mexico